James Blackmore (February 2, 1821 – February 6, 1875) was an American politician. He served as Mayor of Pittsburgh from 1868 to 1869 and 1872 to 1875.

Life
Blackmore was born in 1821 in Washington County, Pennsylvania. His father was County Treasurer in 1855, and young Blackmore served as Chief Clerk.  Mayor Blackmore was engaged in the lumber and coal business.

The city expanded east and George Westinghouse began manufacturing the air brake in the Strip District during Mayor Blackmore's initial term.

A new City Hall was completed on Smithfield Street and the city's southern boundaries were extended during Mayor Blackmore's second term. James Blackmore's last address was 167 Wylie Avenue.
His only child was called his name sake, James Blackmore Jr, it was unknown what he did for a living.

He died February 6, 1875, less than a week after finishing his term, and is buried in Allegheny Cemetery.
His only known living relative lives in Worthing, United Kingdom and is a direct descendant of James Blackmore Sr.

See also

List of mayors of Pittsburgh

Sources
 James Blackmore at Political Graveyard
 Norman J. Meinert's list of plots in Allegheny Cemetery

1821 births
1875 deaths
Mayors of Pittsburgh
Burials at Allegheny Cemetery
19th-century American politicians